Micrandropsis is a plant genus of the family Euphorbiaceae first described as a genus in 1973. It contains only one known species, Micrandropsis scleroxylon, endemic to the State of Amazonas in northwestern Brazil.

References

Monotypic Euphorbiaceae genera
Crotonoideae
Endemic flora of Brazil